Planet Sketch is an animated television series produced by Aardman Animations and Decode Entertainment. The show was first aired on CITV on September 10, 2005, and later began airing on the Canadian network Teletoon starting on November 19, 2005. The series ended its run on September 16, 2008.

In the United States, the show (mainly season two) would officially be broadcast on Nickelodeon's Nicktoons Network via Shorts in a Bunch.

Overview
Each episode features an assortment of sketches. The show typically begins with a Nose Picker sketch, in which a girl named Olivia pulls out an object from her nose (which is also the title of each episode in Season 1). From then on, several sketches are played out to fill the remainder of the show, culminating with the June Spume and Melville sketch, in which a girl named June Spume uses her body parts to produce music, such as her teeth as a piano, which accompanies the show's theme music as the show ends.

Typically, there is only one of each type of 3D sketch per episode, but some segments appear twice, and some do not appear at all. The 2D sketches Sara Swapsy, Only Joking, Ira and Lyra, and Bill and Phil always consist of three parts, which alternate with one other sketch in between each portion. The other one-time sketches follow the same pattern but with only two parts each, while the remaining recurring sketches are treated as regular segments.

In the second season, however, only Melville appears, featuring in a dance clip before the credits roll. The Nose Picker sketch still appears though. In this show, the 2D sketches never return, and the show went completely 3D. The second season adds new characters. 2D segments and some 3D characters removed, such as The Gnaughty Gnomes and Mr. Hives & Timbo. In addition, characters dance between segments, or the Planet Sketch sign is shown with a gag, and the 3D format is slightly different from the past, because of the different shape of the characters' eyes, the short depth of their heads and the huge shading on them not showing the glossy surface of their appearance.

Sketches

Original 3-D sketches

Nose Picker: A girl named Olivia pulls out an object from her nose, which is also the title of each episode.
Ninja Handyman: A family resorts to the help of a ninja to solve everyday mundane problems (such as using a rolling pin to squeeze the last few dollops of toothpaste from its tube). In the first season, the family liked Ninja Handyman, but in the second season, the family sometimes gets really annoyed and irritated when he appears in their home. In the first season, Ninja Handyman works very hard in anything he does, but in the second season, he is rather lazy, a bit careless, somewhat insane, accident-prone and much more comical.
Japanese Fighting Fish: Three fishes Robby (Orange), Billy (Green) and Mac (Pink) (claiming to be "real hard" Japanese fighting fish) who bully another (typically much larger) fish that is cohabiting in the same tank, or another sea creature or an item, only for the other fish, object or sea creature to retaliate in kind.
Parping Ponies: A horse named Horace and his aunt Hortense try to avoid the embarrassment that usually results from Horace's flatulence problem. Sometimes (but rarely) Hortense also has flatulence.
Mr. Hives and Timbo: A boy named Timbo tries to avoid his teddy bear Mr. Hives, which he claims to have outgrown. Mr. Hives inevitably reappears with his ominous catchphrase "Huggy, huggy!". He appears in all manner of places, including in a ketchup bottle, behind garden gnomes and on television.
Napkin Squirrel: A storyteller tells the story of a paper (origami) squirrel and what it considers fun — the things that harm the squirrel in any way, shape, or form are said to be "no fun at all".
Dr. Inosaur: A dinosaur doctor who tries to eat his patients, but fails. In the first season, he works in the doctor's office at the clinic. But in the second season, he works at the hospital and try to eat his patients anyway he can without being interrupted by the speaker (as seen in "Yoga").
Captain Gagtastic: The namesake supervillain, who terrorizes a family by telling anti-jokes and makes them cry instead of laughing.
Rude Limerick Boy: A boy who shows up on stage to perform a limerick, in which the limerick's last word is typically unsuitable for the audience, so he is interrupted before saying it, usually by an object from his limerick.
Mad Dad Scientist: A father who pretends to be a mad scientist about to finish an invention, only to be interrupted by his son Kirk, which at the same time reveals that the father was simply repairing a common household item, or doing a household task, such as getting a spider out of the bathtub.
The Gnaughty Gnomes: An elderly lady (or occasionally a member of the Ninja Handyman family) is enamoured by a set of lawn gnomes, only to faint in shock when discovering that the three gnomes are alive and acting in a typically destructive manner.
News Reporters: News anchors Mike Today and Sally Van have gender wars by taking shots at the opposite gender. At the end of the sketch it is revealed that the two have a crush on each other, and they kiss in the first-season finale. In the second season, this changes with the characters sharing the same views as their news reports.
Street Rappers: A group of three street rappers do something in a manner that is completely different from their image (mostly immature things), only to be caught by an innocent bystander, who is one of the members of the Ninja Handyman family. In the second season, they would rap like normal, one of them would say something dumb, and the other two would exclaim.
Why the Dinosaurs Died Out: A humorous take on why dinosaurs became extinct "60 million years ago last Tuesday".
June Spume and Melville: A girl plays instruments with various parts of her body while a cat dances.

Season 1 (2005)

Recurring 2-D sketches

My Mother the Armchair: A teenage girl consistently becomes embarrassed by her mother: a yellow armchair with a purse.
Sara Swapsy: A girl tries to swap an array of miscellaneous objects for an item that she sees with a random person (e.g.: the mother of a small boy).
Only Joking: A young boy asks his father why something happens (e.g.: why bees collect honey) and his father jokingly replies with fictional comments (e.g.: Only honey bees collect honey, it's the brain bees you should look out for) which usually results with the boy running away screaming and the father saying "Only joking, son! Dear, oh dear".  However, the father's "joke" turns out to be true during the last sketch shown in each episode, and it backfires on him.
Ira and Lyra: Two girls tell their mother a goofy fake story to get each other in trouble about why one of them, for example, poured water on the other, only to be caught out for a small detail such as where a certain bus stops.
Okay Coach, I'm Ready: A boy named Nathan dresses up in a sports costume only to find he's doing the wrong sport as indicated by his coach.

One-time 2-D sketches

Bill and Phil: Two boys reveal themselves to be disguised in successive costumes of characters from outer space, such as an alien.
Talent Show: A talent show features an assortment of unusual characters with unique abilities.
Alien Game Show: An extraterrestrial game show featuring aliens that talk gibberish alien language. The host gives a question to the four alien contestants, and when they got the answer right, they get a point. If they got it wrong, they lose a point and get tortured.
Dragon Burping Contest: Another game show, where two dragons must overpower each other and gain points by burping.

Season 2 (2006)

New 3-D sketches

The Two Astronauts: These two men named Jake and the Captain who are always in the cockpit of their spaceship and have problems with their computer (stylized as a metallic silver head with pink hair and baby blue eyes) who acts like a human or acts stupidly.
The Hypno Poodle: A poodle who always gets what he wants, because he hypnotizes people, and mostly its owners into doing animal things or bizarre things.
Master Handyman: Ninja Handyman's counterpart, white-dressed and really more helpful than the normal Ninja Handyman.
Melville: He replaces the June Spume sketch. He is now working as a janitor, but when the lights turn on, he starts dancing. The music always differs each episode.

Episodes
The series has been aired in both full-episode and short form. The following information is for the full-length episodes only.

The first 10 episodes were shown on Teletoon in three blocks on November 19, 2005 as part of a special event on the channel called "Nonsense Day".

Season 1 (2005)

Season 2 (2007-2008)

References

External links

2005 Canadian television series debuts
2008 Canadian television series endings
2000s Canadian animated television series
2000s Canadian sketch comedy television series
2005 British television series debuts
2008 British television series endings
2000s British animated television series
2000s British television sketch shows
British children's animated comedy television series
British computer-animated television series
Canadian children's animated comedy television series
Canadian computer-animated television series
Children's sketch comedy
English-language television shows
Teletoon original programming
Television series by DHX Media
Television series by Aardman Animations